Hudson Music (formerly DCI Music Video from 1982 to 1997) is an American music publishing and distribution company founded in New York City by Robert Wallis and Paul Siegel.

History
Before getting into the publishing industry, founder Rob Wallis was an owner of The Drummer's Collective in New York, purchasing it with partner Paul Siegel in 1980. They founded DCI Music Video in 1982 to produce drum-oriented educational VHS tapes as a way to diversify their educational offerings. One of the first DCI products was a video featuring Steve Gadd. Another early release was The History of R&B/Funk Drumming with Yogi Horton. 

The business was a success and in 1992 they sold the catalog, though retained creative control, to CPP/Belwin which would later be acquired by Warner Brothers. With Warner Brothers they had access to distribution by Hal Leonard. They also started a related company for book publishing, Manhattan Music. In 1998, Wallis and Siegel started Hudson Music to shift from VHS to DVD format. The first Hudson DVD featured Steve Smith of Journey fame. Hudson also gained notoriety by releasing several DVDs with famed drummer Neil Peart of Rush, including his Anatomy of a Drum Solo in 2005. 

In 2007, Hudson launched the Hudson Limited label for independently produced content and in 2009 launched Hudson Digital to offer downloadable content on their website, including over 200 titles. Hudson added print books and eBooks to their product offerings, and in 2009 brought on Joe Bergamini as Senior Editor. Continuing with their digital content theme, in 2013 Hudson launched a Hudson Digital Bookstore app. Hudson content has won Wallis and Siegel the Modern Drummer Editor's Achievement Award and the Percussive Arts Society President's Achievement Award. In 2020, Hudson partnered with Alfred Music to release many of their classic instructional titles in a downloadable digital format, along with many titles from Modern Drummer publications, Hal Leonard, and Rebeats.

Artists and authors

 Chris Adler 
 Carmine Appice
 Carter Beauford
 Ryan Alexander Bloom
 Dennis Chambers 
 Phil Collins 
 Seth Davis
 Virgil Donati 
 Dom Famularo 
 Steve Gadd 
 David Garibaldi
 Mark Guiliana
 Lionel Hampton
 Claus Hessler 
 George Kollias 
 Thomas Lang 
 Mike Mangini 
 Jojo Mayer 
 Russ Miller 
 Ian Paice
 Neil Peart
 Mike Portnoy 
 Rocco Prestia
 Tito Puente 
 Johnny Rabb 
 Derek Roddy 
 Todd Sucherman 
 Chad Smith
 Steve Smith 
 Dave Weckl
 Victor Wooten

References 

L
Music publishing companies of the United States